South Ostrobothnian dialect is a Western Finnish dialect. It is traditionally spoken in the region of South Ostrobothnia and parts of Coastal Ostrobothnia. The South Ostrobothnian dialect has many features that are unique to the region of South Ostrobothnia. 

South Ostrobothnian is surrounded by 4 different forms of speech, Savonian, Tavastian, Southwestern Finnish (Northern Satakunta) and Swedish. Savonian has mainly influenced eastern South Ostrobothnian, Tavastian has influenced southeastern South Ostrobothnian and western South Ostrobothnian was influenced more by Swedish.

Features 
Written Finnish /d/ has changed into /r/  lehren "leaf's" (Written: lehden)
Written Finnish ts is tt  mettä "forest" (Written: metsä)
Diphthongs  uo, yö and ie are ua, yä and iä in South Ostrobothnian - nuari "young" (Written: nuori)
Middle vowel  tylysä "boring" (Written: tylsä)
Inessive ending  maas "in the ground" (Written: maassa)
Vowel i-  i- in written Finnish is replaced by a long vowel - keltaanen "yellow" (Written: keltainen)
Consonant gradiation  jalka - jalaat "foot" - "feet" (Written: jalka - jalat)
Verb conjugation  tuomma "we bring" - toima "we brought" (Written: tuomme - toimme), tuletta "you come" - tulija "you came" (Written: tulette - tulitte)

Vocabulary 

 flikka (likka in some regions) 'girl'
 hieta 'sand'
 klasit 'windows'
 friioos 'on a date'
 fiini 'nice'
 hantuuki 'towel'
 kränä 'fight'
 kranni 'neighbour'
 praatata 'speak'
 pruukata 'to have a habit of'
 pirättää 'stop'
 perna 'potato'
 notta 'so that'
 följys 'with'
 moon 'I am'
 soot 'you are'
 son 'he/she/it is'
 moomma 'we are'
 tootta 'you are'
 non 'they are'

Example 
Example from Kurikka, 11.6.1965

Kuinkas sitä maata sillov vilijeltiin kun te semmoonen pieni poika vielä olit- olitta?

No, ei silloin ollu, sitten, apulannoosta juuri mitää, haaraa vielä. Joki, taloollinen osti luujauhoja. Mutta torpparit ei niitä juuri pystyny ostama. Mutta luujauho soli ensimmäinen apulanta mitä minä muistaj jot on käytetty.

Approximate English translation:

How did people farm the land when you were still such a small boy?

Well, there wasn't much of fertiliser to speak of at the time. Houseowners could buy bone powder. But farm workers could hardly ever buy any. But bone powder was the first kind of fertiliser I remember was used.

See also 
 Ostrobothnians
 Central and Northern Ostrobothnian dialects

References 
Finnish dialects